is a given name present in a few languages. It is a unisex Japanese given name that is predominantly used for males. There are several kanji for Akira.

In Thai, Akira or Arkira is a unisex name meaning 'the sun' or 'sunlight'.

Possible writings 
In Japanese there are many alternative ways to write the name Akira in kanji. This is not an exhaustive list. A popular kanji is 明 (the combination of the two different characters 日 = sun and 月 = moon) which means "the light coming from the sun", "sunlight and moonlight", "bright", "intelligent", "wisdom" or "truth". Though Akira is generally used to name males, sometimes it can be a female name as well. 
 明, "bright"
 亮, "light"
 昭, "shining"
 光, "light"
 昌, "prosper"
 晃, "clear"
 彰, "acknowledge"
 朗; "clear/bright"
 晶, "sparkle"
 章, "chapter/section"
 旭; "rising sun"
 顕; "exposure/clarity"
 彬, "refined/gentle"
 明楽, "bright, ease"
 秋良, "autumn, good"
 了, "completion"
 安喜良, "calm, joy, good"
 亜紀良, "asia, chronicle, good"
 日日日, "day, day, day"
 彬良, "refined/gentle, good"
 明良, "bright, good"
 旦 "morning/dawn"

People with the name
, Japanese footballer
, Japanese manga artist
, Japanese footballer
, Japanese Magic: The Gathering player
, Japanese footballer
, Japanese racing driver
, Japanese mental health counsellor
, Japanese scholar and diplomat
, Japanese swimmer
Akira Himekawa, pen name used by a Japanese duo of manga artists
, Japanese manga artist
, Japanese footballer
, Japanese composer of classical music and film scores
, Japanese racing driver
, Japanese shogi player
Akira Inoue (disambiguation), multiple people
Akira Ioane (born 1995), New Zealand rugby player
Akira Iriye (born 1934), historian of American diplomatic history
, Japanese sailor
, Japanese voice actor
, Japanese-American engineer and academic
, fashion designer
, hockey player
, Japanese manga artist
, Japanese jazz fusion drummer
, Japanese football player
, Japanese guitarist
, Japanese voice actor
, Japanese manga artist
, Japanese comedian, television personality and actor
, Japanese actor and singer
, Japanese basketball player
, Japanese artist
, Japanese film director, producer, and screenwriter
, head of the Japanese Supreme Court
, wrestler
, Japanese karate practitioner
, Japanese composer
, Japanese scholar and politician
, Filipino-Japanese actor and singer
, general in the Imperial Japanese Army
, Japanese sport wrestler
, Japanese football defender
, Japanese shogi player
, Japanese professional wrestler
, Japanese free jazz saxophonist
, Japanese alpine skier
, Japanese voice actor
, Japanese photographer
, Japanese ski jumper
Akira Schmid (born 2000), Swiss ice hockey player
, Japanese voice actress
, Japanese composer
, Japanese shogi player
, Japanese professional mixed martial artist
Akira Suzuki (disambiguation), multiple people
, Japanese footballer
, Japanese actor
, heavy metal guitarist
, Japanese sumo wrestler
Akira Takeuchi (disambiguation), multiple people
, Japanese city planner
, Japanese professional wrestler
, entertainer
, Japanese diplomat
, Japanese ophthalmologist and photographer
, Japanese manga and game artist
, Japanese professional wrestler
Akira Watanabe (disambiguation), multiple people
, Japanese professional boxer
, Japanese philosopher
, Japanese trade unionist
, Japanese artist
, Japanese World War II flying ace
, Japanese composer and music producer
, Japanese water polo player
, Japanese rugby union player
, Japanese chemist
, Japanese origamist

Fictional characters 
Akira (Akira), the title character of Akira
Akira Asai, a character from Call of the Night
Akira (Blue Mask), a character in Hikari Sentai Maskman
Akira Asaba (麻羽 央), a character in Magical Trans!
Akira Momoi, a character in Denshi Sentai Denziman
Akira Kogane, a character in Voltron: Defender of the Universe, also known as Beast King GoLion (given name changed to 'Keith' for the US adaptations)
Akira (The Simpsons), a character in The Simpsons media
Akira Agarkar Yamada, a character in Tsuritama media
Akira Hojo, a character in Sanctuary
Akira Inugami (aka Wolf), a character in the manga Wolf Guy
Akira Hayama, a character in the manga Shokugeki no Soma
Akira Himi (aka Aqua Current), a character in the light novel Accel World
Akira Kazama, a character in Rival Schools media
Akira Kogami, a character in Lucky Star franchise
Akira, a character in Shin Megami Tensei IV franchise
Akira Kurusu, the protagonist's name in the manga adaptation of Persona 5
Akira Kusano, a character in Nobuta wo Produce media
Akira Mimasaka, a character in Boys Over Flowers media
Akira Okochi, a character in Negima!: Magister Negi Magi media
Akira Okuzaki, a character in My-HiME media
Akira Renbokoji, a character in the anime Kakumeiki Valvrave
Akira Satou, a character in Katawa Shoujo
 Akira Sendoh, a character in the manga Slam Dunk
Akira Sengoku, the main character in the manga Eden no Ori
Akira Sohma, a character in Fruits Basket
Akira Tachibana (橘 あきら), a protagonist in the manga After the Rain (manga)
Akira Takano, a character in School Rumble media
Akira Takizawa, a character in the anime Eden of the East
Akira Toudou, a character in the Special A
Akira Toya, a character in Hikaru no Go media
Akira Udō, a character in Air Gear media
Akira Yuki, a character in the Virtua Fighter universe
Akira Kaburagi Regendorf, the protagonist in the Dance in the Vampire Bund manga and its anime adaption
Akira, a character in the anime and manga Samurai Deeper Kyo
Akira, a character in the manga Dengeki Daisy
Akira, the main protagonist in the BL visual novel Togainu no Chi
Akira Rai, a character in Jab Tak Hai Jaan
Akira Fudo, the main character in Devilman
Akira Mado, a supporting character in the manga series, Tokyo Ghoul
Akira Shimotsuki, a supporting character in the manga series, Watashi ni xx Shinasai
Akira Kunimi (国見 英), a character from Haikyu!! with the position of wing spiker for Aoba Johsai High
Akira Midousuji (御堂筋 翔 Midōsuji Akira), a character in the manga and anime Yowamushi Pedal
Akira Nijino, a character from Ressha Sentai ToQger
Akira Kenjou (剣城 あきら), a character in the anime series Kirakira PreCure a la Mode
Akira Yamabuki (Yamatoga in the English dub), a character from the anime series Beyblade Burst 
Akira Toudou, a character from the manga series World's End Harem
Akira Takaoka, an antagonist in Assassination Classroom
Akira Nishikiyama, an antagonist from the game series YakuzaAkira Howard, the twin of the main protagonist in Astral ChainAkira Otoishi, a minor antagonist in Jojo’s Bizarre AdventureAkira Yukishiro, a character in the Revue Starlight'' franchise

See also
Akira (disambiguation)

References

Japanese unisex given names
Unisex given names